Francis John Alford (14 May 1901 - 1983) was a footballer who played in The Football League for Everton, Barrow and Lincoln City. He also played for Swindon Town, Darwen and Scunthorpe & Lindsey United.

References

English footballers
Swindon Town F.C. players
Darwen F.C. players
Barrow A.F.C. players
Scunthorpe United F.C. players
Everton F.C. players
Lincoln City F.C. players
English Football League players
1901 births
1982 deaths
Association football outside forwards
Sportspeople from Swindon